The 1964 American Road Race of Champions was the first running of the SCCA National Championship Runoffs. It took place on 14 and 15 November 1964 at the Riverside International Raceway. The ARRC was held as the non-championship final round of the SCCA National Sports Car Championship and the SCCA Divisional Championships. Most competitive drivers from SCCA's six divisions were invited to the event. No championships were contested that year as part of the Runoffs, and therefore, ARRC champions were not SCCA National Champions.

Race results 
Sources:

Class winners for multi-class races in bold.

Race 1 - Formula Vee 
The first race, held on November 14, was the Formula Vee race. It was held for 45 minutes and 23 laps.

Race 2 - H Production 
The H Production race was held on November 14 for 45 minutes and 23 laps.

Race 3 - G Production 
The G Production race was held on November 14 for 45 minutes and 23 laps.

Race 4 - H Modified 
The H Modified race was held on November 14 for 45 minutes and 24 laps.

Race 5 - E & F Modified 
E Modified & F Modified drivers raced in a multi-class race held on November 14 for 45 minutes and 27 laps.

Race 6 - E Production 
The E Production race was held for on November 14 for 45 minutes and 25 laps.

Race 7 - F Production 
The F Production race was held on November 14 for 45 minutes and 23 laps.

Race 8 - G Modified 
The G Modified race was held on November 15 for 45 minutes and 26 laps.

Race 9 - C Production 
The C Production race was held on November 15 for 45 minutes and 25 laps.

Race 10 - Formula Junior & Libre 
Formula Libre & Formula Junior drivers raced in a multi-class race held on November 15 for 45 minutes and 27 laps.

Race 11 - C & D Modified 
C Modified & D Modified drivers raced in a multi-class race held on November 15 for 45 minutes and 28 laps.

Race 12 - A & B Production 
A Production & B Production drivers raced in a multi-class race held on November 15 for 45 minutes and 27 laps. There were originally two separate races scheduled, but the entrant number was too low for two races.

Race 13 - D Production 
The final race was the D Production race. It was held on November 15 for 45 minutes and 25 laps.

Legacy 
The event has been a big success. More than 160 drivers have arrived to the ARRC, including future road racing stars such as Chuck Parsons, Jerry Titus, Rick Muther, Bob Sharp, Jerry Hansen, Bob Tullius, Ed Leslie, Jim Downing, Ron Grable, Dave Jordan, Dick Guldstrand and George Alderman. The race has been the first race from the late 1950s that saw amateur West Coast and East Coast racers compete against each other, as the SCCA National Sports Car Championship was East Coast-only and the USRRC, despite allowing amateur drivers to compete, was a pro championship.

The 1964 American Road Race of Champions started a new chapter in the history of American amateur road racing. The National Championship was cancelled for 1965 and the ARRC became the only interdivisional amateur road race. It was still a non-championship event until 1966, when Runoffs winners in each class became National Champions.

Notes 
Due to limited attention to SCCA amateur races at the time, the results are not fully complete and there are a lot of inaccuracies.

Formula Vee 
Some sources say that Downing was the pole-sitter in race, which is not confirmed by the SCCA.

G Production 
2The SCCA site says Mernone ran for 4 laps, while other sources say she ran only for three laps.

E & F Modified 
3Some sources say Candler had an Elva Mk VII for the race.

F Production 
4Noah's pole is debated by the SCCA website, so Riggs could be the pole-sitter.

C Production 
5The SCCA website lists Ward running a Lotus Elan, but in the entry list he is listed running a Super Seven.

References 

SCCA National Sports Car Championship
SCCA National Championship Runoffs
1964 in American motorsport